Roman Oleksandrovych Honcharenko (born 16 November 1993) is a Ukrainian professional footballer who plays as a centre-back for Ukrainian club Kolos Kovalivka.

Career 
On 7 February 2020, Honcharenko signed for Ukrainian Second League club Veres Rivne.

Career statistics

Club

External links

References 

1993 births
Living people
Ukrainian footballers
FC Cherkashchyna players
FC Inhulets Petrove players
Ukrainian Premier League players
Ukrainian First League players
Ukrainian Second League players
FC Polissya Zhytomyr players
FC Kremin Kremenchuk players
NK Veres Rivne players
FC Kolos Kovalivka players
Association football defenders
Sportspeople from Cherkasy Oblast